West of Scotland was one of the eight electoral regions of the Scottish Parliament that were created in 1999. Nine of the Parliament's 73 first past the post constituencies were sub-divisions of the region and it elected seven of the 56 additional-member Members of the Scottish Parliament (MSPs). Thus it elected a total of 16 MSPs.

The West of Scotland region shared boundaries with the Central Scotland, Glasgow, Highlands and Islands, and Mid Scotland and Fife regions.

Following the First Periodic Review of Scottish Parliament Boundaries it was eventually replaced by the West Scotland region.

Constituencies and local government areas

In terms of first past the post constituencies the region covered:

The constituencies were created in 1999 with the names and boundaries of Westminster constituencies, as existing at that time. Scottish Westminster constituencies were mostly replaced with new constituencies in 2005.

In terms of local government areas the region covered:

 West Dunbartonshire
 East Renfrewshire
 Inverclyde
 Most of Renfrewshire (otherwise within the Glasgow region)
 Most of East Dunbartonshire (otherwise within the Central Scotland region)
 Part of Argyll and Bute (otherwise within the Highlands and Islands region)
 Part of North Ayrshire (otherwise within the South of Scotland region)

Boundary changes

The Boundary Commission recommended changes to the electoral regions used to elect "list" members of the Scottish Parliament. The "West Scotland" region consists of the constituencies of Clydebank and Milngavie; Cunninghame North; Cunninghame South; Dumbarton; Eastwood; Greenock and Inverclyde; Paisley; Renfrewshire North and West; Renfrewshire South; and Starthkelvin and Bearsden. These were newly formed constituencies.

Members of the Scottish Parliament

Constituency MSPs

Regional List MSPs
N.B. This table is for presentation purposes only

Election results

2007 Scottish Parliament election
In the 2007 Scottish Parliament election the region elected MSPs as follows:
 8 Labour MSPs (all constituency members)
 5 Scottish National Party MSPs (one constituency member, 4 additional members)
 2 Conservative MSPs (both additional members)
 1 Liberal Democrat MSP (additional member)

Constituency results 
{| class=wikitable
!colspan=4 style=background-color:#f2f2f2|2007 Scottish Parliament election: West of Scotland
|-
! colspan=2 style="width: 200px"|Constituency
! style="width: 150px"|Elected member
! style="width: 300px"|Result

Additional member results
{| class=wikitable
!colspan=8 style=background-color:#f2f2f2|2007 Scottish Parliament election: West of Scotland
|-
! colspan="2" style="width: 150px"|Party
! Elected candidates
! style="width: 40px"|Seats
! style="width: 40px"|+/−
! style="width: 50px"|Votes
! style="width: 40px"|%
! style="width: 40px"|+/−%
|-

2003 Scottish Parliament election
In the 2003 Scottish Parliament election the region elected MSPs as follows:

 8 Labour MSPs (all constituency members)
 3 Scottish National Party MSPs (all additional members)
 2 Conservative MSPs (both additional members)
 1 Independent MSP (constituency member)
 1 Liberal Democrat MSPs (additional member)
 1 Scottish Socialist Party MSP (additional member)

Constituency results
{| class=wikitable
!colspan=4 style=background-color:#f2f2f2|2003 Scottish Parliament election: West of Scotland
|-
! colspan=2 style="width: 200px"|Constituency
! style="width: 150px"|Elected member
! style="width: 300px"|Result

Additional member results
{| class=wikitable
!colspan=8 style=background-color:#f2f2f2|2003 Scottish Parliament election: West of Scotland
|-
! colspan="2" style="width: 150px"|Party
! Elected candidates
! style="width: 40px"|Seats
! style="width: 40px"|+/−
! style="width: 50px"|Votes
! style="width: 40px"|%
! style="width: 40px"|+/−%
|-

1999 Scottish Parliament election
In the 1999 Scottish Parliament election the region elected MSPs as follows:

 9 Labour MSPs (all constituency members)
 4 Scottish National Party MSPs (all additional members)
 2 Conservative MSPs (both additional members)
 1 Liberal Democrat MSP (additional member)

Constituency results
{| class=wikitable
!colspan=4 style=background-color:#f2f2f2|1999 Scottish Parliament election: West of Scotland
|-
! colspan=2 style="width: 200px"|Constituency
! style="width: 150px"|Elected member
! style="width: 300px"|Result
 
 
 
 
 
 
 
 
 
 
Changes:
 On 20 March 2001 Sam Galbraith resigned, citing health reasons. At the subsequent Strathkelvin and Bearsden by-election held 7 June 2001, Brian Fitzpatrick held the seat for Labour.

Additional member results
{| class=wikitable
!colspan=8 style=background-color:#f2f2f2|1999 Scottish Parliament election: West of Scotland
|-
! colspan="2" style="width: 150px"|Party
! Elected candidates
! style="width: 40px"|Seats
! style="width: 40px"|+/−
! style="width: 50px"|Votes
! style="width: 40px"|%
! style="width: 40px"|+/−%
|-

Footnotes 

Scottish Parliament constituencies and regions 1999–2011